The 2016 North Carolina Education Lottery 200 was the 6th stock car race of the 2016 NASCAR Camping World Truck Series, and the 14th iteration of the event. The race was originally going be held on Friday, May 20, 2016, but due to inclement weather, it was postponed until Saturday, May 21, in Concord, North Carolina at Charlotte Motor Speedway, a 1.5-mile (2.4 km) permanent tri-oval shaped racetrack. The race took the scheduled 134 laps to complete. Matt Crafton, driving for ThorSport Racing, survived a string of green-flag pit stops, and earned his 13th career NASCAR Camping World Truck Series win, and his second of the season. Crafton also dominated parts of the race, leading 47 laps. To fill out the podium, Kyle Busch, driving for his team, Kyle Busch Motorsports, and Johnny Sauter, driving for GMS Racing, would finish 2nd and 3rd, respectively.

Background 

Charlotte Motor Speedway is a motorsport complex located in Concord, North Carolina,  outside Charlotte. The complex features a  quad oval track that hosts NASCAR racing including the prestigious Coca-Cola 600 on Memorial Day weekend, and the Bank of America Roval 400. The speedway was built in 1959 by Bruton Smith and is considered the home track for NASCAR with many race teams located in the Charlotte area. The track is owned and operated by Speedway Motorsports with Greg Walter as track president.

The  complex also features a state-of-the-art  drag racing strip, ZMAX Dragway. It is the only all-concrete, four-lane drag strip in the United States and hosts NHRA events. Alongside the drag strip is a state-of-the-art clay oval that hosts dirt racing including the World of Outlaws finals among other popular racing events.

Entry list 

 (R) denotes rookie driver.
 (i) denotes driver who is ineligible for series driver points.

Practice 
The first and only practice session was held on Thursday, May 19, at 12:30 pm EST, and would last for 1 hour. Because of persistent rain, the second and final practice sessions would be cancelled.

Qualifying 
Qualifying was originally going to be held on Friday, May 20, at 5:30 pm EST. Since Charlotte Motor Speedway is at least 1.5 miles (2.4 km) in length, the qualifying system was a single car, single lap, two round system where in the first round, everyone would set a time to determine positions 13–32. Then, the fastest 12 qualifiers would move on to the second round to determine positions 1–12.

Qualifying would be cancelled due to inclement weather. The starting lineup would be determined by speeds during practice. As a result, William Byron, driving for Kyle Busch Motorsports would earn the pole.

Austin Cindric, Caleb Holman, Jesse Little, and Austin Hill would fail to qualify.

Starting lineup

Race results

Standings after the race 

Drivers' Championship standings

Note: Only the first 8 positions are included for the driver standings.

References 

NASCAR races at Charlotte Motor Speedway
May 2016 sports events in the United States
2016 in sports in North Carolina